Gastão Elias won the title, beating Andrej Martin 6–2, 7–6(7–4)

Seeds

Draw

Finals

Top half

Bottom half

References
 Main Draw
 Qualifying Draw

Lima Challenger - Singles